Irene Curran Montie (December 12, 1921 – December 23, 2018) was an American statistician in the US government service who became president of the Caucus for Women in Statistics.

Early life and education
Montie was born in Tannersville, New York; her parents, Michael Edward Curran and Catherine Keogh Curran, were of Irish descent. She earned two associate degrees, two bachelor's degrees (from Upper Iowa University in 1973 and New York University in 1974), two master's degrees (from the University of Northern Colorado in 1974 and Central Michigan University in 1976), and a Ph.D., which she completed in 1976 at Walden University. Her dissertation was Application of Change Theory for Alleviation of Prejudicial Barriers to Career Advancement for Women: A Study in Two Federal Agencies, and was supervised by Harry Kranz.

Career
Before joining the United States Census Bureau, Montie founded a childcare firm.
From 1969 to 1978 she was chief of the Sampling Procedures Branch of the Census Bureau.
In the early 1980s she was director of the Survey and Statistical Design Division in the Office of Energy Systems and Support, United States Department of Energy.
Afterwards, she also worked in the Office of Management and Budget.

Service
Montie became president of the Caucus for Women in Statistics for the 1979 term. She also served on the Information Resources Management Curriculum Advisory Committee of Graduate School USA.

References

1921 births
2018 deaths
American statisticians
Women statisticians
Upper Iowa University alumni
New York University alumni
University of Northern Colorado alumni
Central Michigan University alumni